The Six Blanc is a mountain of the Swiss Pennine Alps, overlooking Orsières in the canton of Valais. It lies at the northern end of the chain separating the valley of Entremont from the valley of Bagnes, culminating at the Grand Combin.

References

External links
 Six Blanc on Hikr

Mountains of the Alps
Mountains of Valais
Mountains of Switzerland
Two-thousanders of Switzerland